Chano y Dizzy! is a collaborative studio album by conga player Poncho Sanchez and jazz trumpeter Terence Blanchard. The release contains 11 tracks inspired by the works of Dizzy Gillespie and Chano Pozo
whose short-lived musical collaboration began in the late 1940s and ended after Pozo's murder in 1948. The album was released by Concord on September 27, 2011. In 2012, the album was nominated for Latin Grammy Award for Best Latin Jazz/Jazz Album.

Reception
Jeff Tamarkin in his review for JazzTimes wrote, "Using standard Latin orchestra instrumentation-congas, bongos, timbales and drums; saxophones, trumpet and trombone; piano, bass and vocals-Sanchez and Blanchard raid the Gillespie/Pozo catalog, recycle a couple of Blanchard’s favorites and cherry-pick the rest, including three from trombonist Francisco Torres, who co-produced this session with Sanchez. " Brian Boyles of Offbeat commented, "If there’s anything lacking here, it may be the original soil. We find two artists at ease in their exchange and shared vocabulary; here is Latin jazz in perfect form. The sound is a sure-handed culmination of 60 years of music, rather than a risky return to some genesis moment. Hopefully such a well-crafted door will beckon others to pass through and investigate that still-fertile landscape." AllMusic's Matt Collar added, "An inspired and heartfelt tribute, Chano y Dizzy! is a must-hear for Latin jazz fans as well as longtime Sanchez and Blanchard listeners."

Howard Reich of the Chicago Tribune observed, "Blanchard's piercing top notes, high-velocity figurations and lyrical asides attested to his stature as trumpet virtuoso and creative improviser. The carefully conceived orchestral scoring – meticulously played by Sanchez's octet – stood in striking contrast to Blanchard's freely improvised solo flights."

Track listing

Personnel
Tony Banda – bass, vocals
Ron Francis Blake – trumpet
Terence Blanchard – trumpet
Joey De Leon, Jr. – bongos, drums, percussion
Rob Hardt – sax (alto), sax (tenor)
George Ortiz – timbales
Poncho Sanchez – congas, percussion, vocals
David Torres – piano
Francisco Torres – trombone, vocals

Chart performance

References

External links

2011 albums
Concord Records albums
Terence Blanchard albums
Collaborative albums
Poncho Sanchez albums